Cavigal Nice Basket is a French professional basketball team located in the city of Nice, . The club was founded in 1943 from the combination of three clubs, AS CAsino,  VIctorine and  GALia Club.

Basketball teams in France
Basketball teams established in 1943
Sport in Nice
1943 establishments in France